The Sufi Trail is an  long-distance footpath in Western Turkey from Istanbul to Konya following the Ottoman Sultans Hajj route. The Sufi Trail connects to the Sultans Trail, a long-distance footpath from Vienna to Istanbul. After Konya Sufi Trail connects with the ancient road to Jerusalem and Mecca via Jerusalem way and Mecca Trail.

History 

The Sufi trail was first described in the 2018 two-part book Sufi Trail: 40 Days to Dervishhood by Iris Bezuijen and Sedat Çakir. The books describe the route in 40 stages, each of which ends at a settlement with usually some overnight accommodation nearby.

Route 
The description in this article is given from west to east. This is the recommended direction since it puts the heaviest climbs at the end of the route.

The trail begins at Bahariye Mevlevihanesi in Istanbul's Eyüp neighborhood. The route passes through Istanbul and then crosses the Sea of Marmara by ferry to Yalova. From there it crosses the provinces of Yalova, Bursa, Bilecik, Eskişehir, Ayonkarahisar and Konya to reach the mausoleum of Jalal ad-Din Muhammad Rumi in Mevlana Museum on Mevlava Square in Konya.

Places of interest 
Istanbul and Konya, the starting point and end point of the trail are both ancient cities full of historic places of interest.

Besides these the trail passes

The Khanqah of Arslanköy
The Turkish baths in Termal
The historic town of İznik
The old city of Eskişehir
The Seyyid Battal Gazi Complex
The Gerdekkaya rock cut tomb monument and other Phrygian period sites near Çukurca
The Midas Monument at Yazılıkaya
The underground city of Han
The Kirkgöz bridge
The old silk road town of Sultandağı
The religious complex of Taşmedrese
The former Greek village of Sille

References

Additional sources

External links 
 Official Sufi Trail website
 Cultural Routes in Turkey
 Daily Sabah
 Sacred Journalism

Trails
Sufism
Hiking trails in Turkey